Candi Carpenter is an American country music singer-songwriter who was born in Toledo, Ohio but raised in Lansing, Michigan. In 2016, Carpenter released her debut single "Burn the Bed", which was produced by Shane McAnally. The song charted on Country Airplay. Carpenter was named by Rolling Stone as one of ten new country artists to watch in 2017.

Chart positions

Singles

References

Living people
American country singer-songwriters
American women country singers
Singer-songwriters from Ohio
Country musicians from Ohio
Country musicians from Michigan
Year of birth missing (living people)
People from Lansing, Michigan
People from Toledo, Ohio
21st-century American women
Singer-songwriters from Michigan